The 1941 Football League War Cup Final was contested by Arsenal and Preston North End. The first tie, played at Wembley Stadium on 4 May 1941, was drawn 1–1, McLaren scoring for Preston before Denis Compton equalised for Arsenal.

The replay took place three weeks later, on 31 May 1941, at Ewood Park. Preston took the lead through Bobby Beattie, but Arsenal equalised late in the game courtesy of an own goal by Frank Gallimore.  Within thirty seconds, Beattie had scored again for Preston, to secure the victory 2–1.



Match details

Final

Replay

References

League War Cup Final 1941
Football League War Cup
War Cup Final 1941
War Cup Final 1941
Football League War Cup Final